Bartolomei is an Italian surname. Notable people with the surname include:

Giuseppe Bartolomei (1923–1996), Italian politician
Marisa Bartolomei, American cell biologist
Paolo Bartolomei (born 1989), Italian footballer
Renato Bartolomei (born 1963), New Zealand actor

See also
Agostino Di Bartolomei (1955–1994), Italian footballer

Italian-language surnames
Patronymic surnames
Surnames from given names